The Midland County Public Library system  provides library services to the county of Midland, Texas, as well as the surrounding counties of Andrews, Martin, Howard, Ector, Glasscock, and Upton. It is currently a 4 branch system consisting of the Downtown Library, the Centennial Library, the Law Library, and a Bookmobile.

History
In early 1903, women of the Ninety-Nine Club and the Time and Tide Club formed a corporation known as the Midland Library Association. They applied for a charter on March 11 of that year. The library was built on the corner of West Wall and Colorado Streets on two lots costing $125. The library building itself cost $1550. The Association had its first meeting in the new library building on 11 June 1904. It was decided that each member of the Association would serve as librarian for one week each in alphabetical order. Books were donated.

In September 1916, The Midland Reporter described the library as, “A very handsome little building, centrally located and free from debt. It is not a Carnegie affair, nor has it had outside assistance of any kind, not even a county or city donation. We credit it to the ladies of the city, who secured private subscription to build it, and who have maintained it by their own efforts. It is nicely furnished, has more than 1000 volumes, and is a very popular place for sundry social gatherings.”

In October 1927, a campaign was begun to convert the library into a county library, and this was accomplished on 1 January 1929. Also in 1929, a petition was circulated asking that the library be moved to the basement of the new courthouse, and this was done.

In 1949, the library became a project of the Altrusa Club which organized the Friends of the Library. In 1956, they circulated a petition for a bond election to build a new library building. This was approved and construction at 301 West Missouri Street began in 1957. The 28,000 square foot building was finished in the summer of 1958 at a cost of $400,000.

By 1971, the library owned a total of 100,000 books which qualified it as a library of the First Class in the American Library Association.

The Midland Centennial Branch Library opened at the Midland Park Mall in late 1984. It was moved to the Imperial Shopping Center in 2004.
  
By 1990, the library collection had outgrown the building, and the Friends of the Library again circulated a petition asking the county commissioners for a 20,000 square foot addition to the Downtown facility. The commissioners voted unanimously for the addition, and it was completed in 1993 at a cost of about $2.5 million.

External links
 Public libraries - Midland County

Libraries in Midland County, Texas
1903 establishments in Texas
Libraries established in 1903
County library systems in Texas
Public libraries in Texas
Libraries participating in TexShare